The cabinet of Governor of New York Andrew Cuomo consisted of the executive chamber and the heads of the various departments of the Government of New York. Cuomo took office on January 1, 2011, as the 56th governor of New York.

Executive Chamber
The following people have been appointed for the respective positions.
Secretary to the Governor: Melissa DeRosa
Chief of Staff and Counselor to the Governor: Linda Lacewell
Deputy Chief of Staff and Senior Advisor: Kelly Cummings
Director of State Operations and Infrastructure: Kelly Cummings
Director of State Policy and Agency Management: Adam Zurofsky
Director of Emergency Management: Michael Kopy
Acting Counsel to the Governor: Beth Garvey
Special Counsel and Senior Advisor: Beth Garvey
Director of the Budget: Robert F. Mujica Jr.
Chairman of Energy and Finance: Richard Kauffman

Lieutenant Governor
Andrew Cuomo's Lieutenant Governor was Kathy Hochul, former United States Representative from New York's 26th district. Hochul replaced the previous Lieutenant Governor, Robert Duffy, the former Mayor of Rochester.

References

State agencies of New York (state)
Andrew Cuomo
State cabinet secretaries of New York (state)